The 2016 Atlantic 10 Conference baseball tournament took place from May 25 through 28.  The top seven regular season finishers of the league's twelve teams met in the double-elimination tournament at Jim Houlihan Park at Jack Coffey Field, the home field of Fordham in the New York City borough of The Bronx. Champions Rhode Island earned the conference's automatic bid to the 2016 NCAA Division I baseball tournament.

Seeding and format
The tournament will use the same format adopted in 2014, with the top seven finishers from the regular season seeded one through seven.  The top seed will receive a single bye while remaining seeds will play on the first day.

Results

References

Tournament
Atlantic 10 Conference Baseball Tournament
Atlantic 10 Conference baseball tournament
Atlantic 10 Conference baseball tournament
2010s in the Bronx
Baseball in New York City
College sports in New York City
Sports competitions in New York City
Sports in the Bronx